Space In Between Us is the third album by Christian rock band Building 429, released in 2004 (original) and 2005 (expanded edition) by Word Records. It is also the band's first full-length record on a national label. Radio singles from this recording include "Glory Defined", "Above it All", "Space in Between Us", and "No One Else Knows".

Track listing

Personnel 
Building 429
 Jason Roy – lead vocals, acoustic piano, guitars 
 Paul Bowden – guitars, backing vocals 
 Scotty Beshears – bass, backing vocals 
 Michael Anderson – drums 

Additional musicians
 Jim Cooper
 Jason Burkum
 Tony Palacios
 Matt Pierson
 Aaron Blanton 
 David Angell – strings
 Monisa Angell – strings
 David Davidson – strings, string arrangements

Production 
 Jim Cooper – producer, overdubbing
 Tony Palacios – recording, mixing 
 Kenzi Butler – recording assistant 
 Bobby Shin – string recording 
 Tresa Jordan – editing 
 Tom Baker – mastering at Precision Mastering, Hollywood, California
 Blaine Barcus – A&R direction 
 Cheryl H. McTyre – A&R administration 
 Mark Lusk – artist development 
 Katherine Petillo – creative direction 
 Jeremy Cowart – design, photography

Studios
 Recorded at Lake Dog Studios and The Sound Kitchen, Franklin, Tennessee; Little Big Sound, Nashville, Tennessee
 Overdubbed and mixed at Lake Dog Studios

References

Building 429 albums
2004 albums